Secondary Highway 522B, commonly referred to as Highway 522B, is a provincially maintained highway in the Canadian province of Ontario.
The highway was created in late 2002 when the Trout Creek Bypass of Highway 11 opened; Highway 522B forms a portion of the former routing.

Route description 
Highway 522B follows a portion of the old alignment of Highway 11 through the community of Trout Creek alongside a Canadian National Railway line. The highway begins at an intersection from which Highway 522 travels south and west. Highway 522B travels north on a slight angle to the grid layout of Trout Creek. After passing Morrison Street and Sweezey Street, it leaves the village and progresses towards the bypass alongside a swamp. After curving northwest, the highway interchanges with Highway 11. It ends shortly thereafter at Hemlock Road, onto which traffic is then directed north.

History 
Highway 522B was created as a result of a realignment of Highway 11, which has been upgraded into a freeway between Huntsville and North Bay. As part of this project, several bypasses have been constructed to avoid established communities along the route. Construction on the Trout Creek Bypass, an  segment of the Highway 11 project, began in July 2000 by Aecon.
When the bypass first opened on October 3, 2002, Highway 11 was diverted onto the new alignment.
The former route of Highway 11 through Trout Creek was renumbered by the end of the year; the section south of the junction with Highway 522 became an extension of that route, while the section north of the junction was designated Highway 522B.
It was Ontario's newest highway designation until the opening of Highway 412 opened nearly 15 years later in the Greater Toronto Area.

Major intersections

References

External links 

 Photography of Trout Creek Bypass 

522B
Roads in Parry Sound District